The Jewish Community of Berkshire (JCoB)  is  an Ashkenazi Modern Orthodox Jewish community based in Reading, Berkshire, England.

The community was established in 2015, following an accident when the rabbi injured his knee and was unable to walk to synagogue. Its rabbi is Zvi Solomons, formerly the rabbi of Reading Hebrew Congregation. Synagogue services are held in the rabbi's home, and the community hosts the only Orthodox rabbinic couple (Rabbi Zvi Solomons and Rebbetzen Dr Shira Batya Lewin Solomons) and cheder in Berkshire. JCoB also provides a visiting service to schools in the region to teach Judaism as part of the Religious Education syllabus agreed by their local SACREs.

See also
 List of Jewish communities in the United Kingdom
 List of synagogues in the United Kingdom

References

External links
Official website
Jewish Small Communities Network: Jewish Community of Berkshire
 Jewish Community of Berkshire on Jewish Communities and Records – UK (hosted by JewishGen)

2015 establishments in England
Ashkenazi Jewish culture in England
Ashkenazi synagogues
Jewish organizations established in 2015
Modern Orthodox Judaism in Europe
Modern Orthodox synagogues
Organisations based in Reading, Berkshire
Orthodox synagogues in England
Religion in Reading, Berkshire